In 2013, the maiden spaceflight of the Orbital Sciences' Antares launch vehicle, designated A-ONE, took place on 13 April. Orbital Science also launched its first spacecraft, Cygnus, that docked with the International Space Station in late September 2013.

A total of 81 orbital launches were attempted in 2013, of which 77 were successful, one was partially successful and three were failures. The year also saw eleven EVAs by ISS astronauts. The majority of the year's orbital launches were conducted by Russia, the United States and China, with 31, 19 and 15 launches respectively.

Overview
India's Indian Space Research Organisation launched its first mission to Mars with the Mars Orbiter Mission that successfully reached Mars orbit on 23 September 2014.

Numerous significant milestones in robotic spaceflight occurred in 2013, including the landing of China's Chang'e 3 lander at Moon's Mare Imbrium on 14 December; it is China's first attempt and first successful soft landing by its spacecraft on an extraterrestrial surface.

Five crewed orbital launches were conducted during 2013, all successfully, carrying a total of 15 astronauts into orbit. Four of these missions were flown with the Russian Soyuz spacecraft and one with the Chinese Shenzhou.

Orbital launches

|colspan=8 style="background:white;"|

January
|-

|colspan=8 style="background:white;"|

February
|-

|colspan=8 style="background:white;"|

March
|-

|colspan=8 style="background:white;"|

April
|-

|colspan=8 style="background:white;"|

May
|-

|colspan=8 style="background:white;"|

June
|-

|colspan=8 style="background:white;"|

July
|-

|colspan=8 style="background:white;"|

August
|-

|colspan=8 style="background:white;"|

September
|-

|colspan=8 style="background:white;"|

October
|-

|colspan=8 style="background:white;"|

November
|-

|colspan=8 style="background:white;"|

December
|-

|}

Suborbital flights 

|}

Deep space rendezvous

Extra-Vehicular Activity (EVAs)

Orbital launch statistics

By country
For the purposes of this section, the yearly tally of orbital launches by country assigns each flight to the country of origin of the rocket, not to the launch services provider or the spaceport. For example, Soyuz launches by Arianespace in Kourou are counted under Russia because Soyuz-2 is a Russian rocket.

By rocket

By family

By type

By configuration

By spaceport

By orbit

References

Citations 

 
Spaceflight by year